Mahmoud Al-Aswad (born 14 September 2003) is a Syrian footballer who currently plays as a midfielder for Al-Karamah.

International career
Having represented Syria at under-20 and under-23 level, Al-Aswad was called up to the senior squad in November 2022 for friendlies against Belarus and Venezuela. He went on to make his debut against Venezuela.

Career statistics

International

References

External links
 

2003 births
Living people
Sportspeople from Homs
Syrian footballers
Syria youth international footballers
Syria international footballers
Association football midfielders
Syrian Premier League players
Al-Karamah players